Westgard or Westgård is a Norwegian surname that may refer to
A. L. Westgard (1865–1921), Norwegian-born American photographer
Westgard Pass in California named after A. L. Westgard
Thomas Hjalmar Westgård (born 1995), Norwegian-born Irish cross-country skier

Norwegian-language surnames